Kentucky Route 178 (KY 178) is a  state highway in Kentucky that travels from KY 106 and KY 507 northeast of Elkton to U.S. Route 68 Business (US 68 Bus.) in western Russellville. It is known locally as Highland Lick Road.

Route description
KY 178 begins at a crossroad intersection with KY 106 (Sharon Grove Road) and KY 507 in the Todd County community of Claymour, the site of KY 507's eastern terminus. KY 178 runs for a few miles in Todd County before it enters Logan County. It intersects KY 2376 and KY 1151 not too far after crossing the county line.

KY 178 reaches the Russellville By-Pass, which is U.S. Route 68 (US 68), US 431, and KY 80, on the west side of town. It continues into the city and reaches its eastern terminus at the intersection with the original US 68, now signed as US 68 Business just west of the public square.

Major intersections

References

External links
KY 178 at Kentucky Roads

0178
0178
0178